The 1935 Utah State Aggies football team was an American football team that represented Utah State Agricultural College—now known as Utah State University as a member of the Rocky Mountain Conference (RMC) during the 1935 college football season. In their 17th season under head coach Dick Romney, the Aggies compiled an overall record of 5–2–1 record with a mark of 5–1–1 against conference opponents, shared the RMC title with Colorado, and outscored all opponents by a total of 165 to 73.

Schedule

References

Utah State
Utah State Aggies football seasons
Rocky Mountain Athletic Conference football champion seasons
Utah State Aggies football